Channel 9 is a Burmese free-to-air television channel. It is operated by Shwe Thanlwin Media. Launched on 30 August 2013, the channel was broadcast only on Skynet DTH. On 15 May 2014, it was broadcast as free-to-air channel. Its headquarters are located in 139/171/A, Lower Pazundaung Road, Botataung Township, Yangon.

Programing 
Myanmar Idol (season 4) (2019)
Yin Khwin Shin Tan (2019)

See also 
Myanmar National TV

References

External links
 

Television channels in Myanmar
Television channels and stations established in 2013
2013 establishments in Myanmar